Nemichthys is a genus of eels in the snipe-eel family Nemichthyidae. It currently contains the following species:

 Nemichthys curvirostris (Strömman, 1896) (boxer snipe-eel)
 Nemichthys larseni J. G. Nielsen & D. G. Smith, 1978
 Nemichthys scolopaceus J. Richardson, 1848 (slender snipe-eel)

References

 

 
Nemichthyidae
Ray-finned fish genera
Taxa named by Theodore Gill
Taxa named by John A. Ryder